Jack Newnes is a former professional Australian rules footballer who played for the St Kilda Football Club and Carlton Football Club in the Australian Football League (AFL).

Early life and career 

Newnes went to St Anthony's Primary School in Alphington, Melbourne. As a youth, he played for Ivanhoe Junior Football Club in the Yarra Junior Football League, and for the Northern Knights in the TAC Cup. He was recruited to the AFL with pick 37 in the 2011 National Draft by the St Kilda Football Club.

Newnes made his debut in Round 2 of the 2012 season against . After seven games in his debut season, he became a mainstay of the senior team for the rest of his time at St Kilda. He played a club equal-record 123 consecutive senior games from 2014 to 2019 and was a member of the club's leadership group for four seasons from 2015 until 2018. He played primarily as a wingman or utility flanker, noted for his effective link play and accurate field kicking. Despite still playing 20 out of 22 games in the season, Newnes turned down a two year contract and asked to be delisted at the conclusion of the 2019 AFL season in order to join Carlton.

Newnes then joined , signing as a delisted free agent, from the 2020 season. He became a mainstay of the Carlton team in the pandemic-interrupted season as a wing/half-back, playing all 17 games. In Round 12, 2020, he kicked a goal after the siren to win the game by four points against Fremantle at Optus Stadium: the high difficulty kick, which came from outside the right boundary line at the 50-metre arc and required him to shoo away a cameraman and move camera cables out of his run-up, was one of three finalists for the AFL Goal of the Year award. He played 19 games in 2021, reducing to 16 games in 2022 for a total of 52 for the club; he was delisted at the conclusion of the 2022 AFL season.

AFL statistics
 Statistics are correct to the end of round 18, 2020

|- style="background-color: #EAEAEA"
! scope="row" style="text-align:center" | 2012
|style="text-align:center;"|
| 16 || 7 || 1 || 0 || 55 || 31 || 86 || 24 || 19 || 0.1 || 0.0 || 7.9 || 4.4 || 12.3 || 3.4 || 2.7
|-
! scope="row" style="text-align:center" | 2013
|style="text-align:center;"|
| 16 || 18 || 0 || 2 || 157 || 116 || 273 || 81 || 42 || 0.0 || 0.1 || 8.7 || 6.4 || 15.2 || 4.5 || 2.3
|- style="background-color: #EAEAEA"
! scope="row" style="text-align:center" | 2014
|style="text-align:center;"|
| 16 || 22 || 3 || 4 || 245 || 192 || 437 || 123 || 85 || 0.1 || 0.2 || 11.1 || 8.7 || 19.9 || 5.6 || 3.9
|-
! scope="row" style="text-align:center" | 2015
|style="text-align:center;"|
| 16 || 22 || 6 || 7 || 262 || 187 || 449 || 132 || 83 || 0.3 || 0.3 || 11.9 || 8.5 || 20.4 || 6.0 || 3.8
|- style="background-color: #EAEAEA"
! scope="row" style="text-align:center" | 2016
|style="text-align:center;"|
| 16 || 22 || 15 || 3 || 307 || 205 || 512 || 98 || 66 || 0.7 || 0.1 || 14.0 || 9.3 || 23.3 || 4.5 || 3.0
|-
! scope="row" style="text-align:center" | 2017
|style="text-align:center;"|
| 16 || 22 || 7 || 10 || 293 || 212 || 505 || 124 || 68 || 0.3 || 0.5 || 13.3 || 9.6 || 23.0 || 5.6 || 3.1
|- style="background-color: #EAEAEA"
! scope="row" style="text-align:center" | 2018
|style="text-align:center;"|
| 16 || 22 || 18 || 17 || 213 || 132 || 345 || 101 || 47 || 0.8 || 0.8 || 9.7 || 6.0 || 15.7 || 4.6 || 2.1
|-
! scope="row" style="text-align:center" | 2019
|style="text-align:center;"|
| 16 || 20 || 5 || 10 || 218 || 128 || 346 || 89 || 53 || 0.3 || 0.5 || 10.9 || 6.4 || 17.3 || 4.5 || 2.7
|- style="background-color: #EAEAEA"
! scope="row" style="text-align:center" | 2020
|style="text-align:center;"|
| 32 || 17 || 13 || 4 || 139 || 83 || 222 || 53 || 44 || 0.8 || 0.2 || 8.2 || 4.9 || 13.1 || 3.1 || 2.6
|-
|- class="sortbottom"
! colspan=3| Career
! 172
! 68
! 57
! 1889
! 1286
! 3175
! 825
! 507
! 0.4
! 0.3
! 11.0
! 7.5
! 18.5
! 4.8
! 2.9
|}

References

External links

1993 births
Living people
St Kilda Football Club players
Australian rules footballers from Victoria (Australia)
Northern Knights players
Sandringham Football Club players
Carlton Football Club players
People educated at Marcellin College, Bulleen